Kushma is a small village and the headquarter of Parbat District in Nepal. Kushma municipality was formed by merging thirteen village development committees  Pang, Khurkot, Durlung, Shivalaya, Chuwa, Katuwa Chaupari, Pipaltari and Pakuwa on 18 May 2014.

This city lies in the western part of Nepal just about 57 km from  Pokhara and 12 km from Baglung. Kushma falls under Western Development Region and Dhaulagiri Zone of Nepal. It is located at 28°13'06N 83°40'45E at an altitude of 1294  meters. Kusma Bazaar straddling a narrow and high strip of land between the banks of Kaligandaki and Modi is the main market centre of the municipality. A bridge joins Kushma with Gyadichour located on the other side of the deep Modi river canyon.

History
From early times Kusma has been an important stop for travellers from Baglung on their way to Pokhara, Palpa and Butwal. Businesses catering to these travelers started to spring up leading to the establishment of a small market. As more settlers arrived Kusma was declared the headquarters of Parbat district.

Demographics
At the time of the 2011 Nepal census, Kushma Municipality had a population of 40,374. Of these, 94.9% spoke Nepali, 2.8% Gurung, 1.1% Newar, 0.3% Magar, 0.2% Maithili, 0.2% Bhojpuri, 0.1% Hindi, 0.1% Tamang and 0.3% other languages as their first language.

In terms of ethnicity/caste, 42.0% were Hill Brahmin, 13.9% Chhetri, 9.1% Sarki, 8.6% Kami, 7.6% Damai/Dholi, 4.2% Magar, 3.7% Gurung, 3.6% Newar, 2.9% Sanyasi/Dasnami and 4.4% others.

In terms of religion, 93.9% were Hindu, 4.8% Buddhist, 0.7% Muslim, 0.4% Christian and 0.2% others.

Transportation
Kushma Bazaar is linked with the national road network by Pokhara Baglung Highway. Buses are the primary means of transportation in Kushma. Small size automobiles and jeeps are used for cab services within Kushma Bazar and surrounding settlements. Motorbikes are popular among the youth. Ownership of private cars in Kushma has increased in recent years. The Baglung Airport located across the Kaligandaki river in Balewa of Baglung provided air travel before its closing. Now re-opening of the airport is under consideration. Recently a cable car bridge has come into operation connecting Kushma Bazar and Balewa reducing two long hours of walking to a five-minute ride.

See also 
 Katuwa Chaupari
 Parbat District
 Nepal
 Patichaur
 Gupteswor Cave, Parbat
 Khurkot
khaula lakuri
 Mauja village. Tilahar

References

External links
UN map of the municipalities of Parbat District

Populated places in Parbat District
Parbat District
Nepal municipalities established in 2014
Municipalities in Gandaki Province